Sunshine Reggae in Ibiza is a 1983 West German comedy film directed by Franz Marischka and starring Karl Dall, Olivia Pascal, and Chris Roberts.

Cast

References

Bibliography

External links 
 

1983 films
West German films
German comedy films
1983 comedy films
1980s German-language films
Films directed by Franz Marischka
Films scored by Gerhard Heinz
Films set in Ibiza
1980s German films